Lee Hee-jin (born 16 May 1979) is a South Korean actress and former member of girl group Baby V.O.X.

Lee studied at Dong-Ah Broadcasting College, then made her entertainment debut in 1997 as a member of popular K-pop girl group Baby V.O.X. After Baby V.O.X. disbanded in 2006, Lee decided to pursue an acting career. After joining a few stage plays and musicals, Lee was cast in the television drama It's Okay, Daddy's Girl (2010). She has since played supporting roles in The Greatest Love (2011), My Lover, Madame Butterfly (2012), and Monstar (2013).

In 2011, she was chosen Best New Actress in the TV Drama category at the 19th Korean Culture and Entertainment Awards.

Filmography

Television series

Film

Variety show

Theater

Discography

References

External links 
 Lee Hee-jin at Cyworld 
 
 Baby V.O.X profile at AsiaFinest

1979 births
K-pop singers
Living people
South Korean female idols
South Korean women pop singers
South Korean television actresses
Dong-ah Institute of Media and Arts alumni
21st-century South Korean singers
21st-century South Korean women singers